Armillaria sparrei is a species of mushroom in the family Physalacriaceae.

See also 
 List of Armillaria species

References 

sparrei
Fungal tree pathogens and diseases
Taxa named by Rolf Singer